Royal Air Force Bushey Hall or more simply RAF Bushey Hall is a former Second World War non-flying Royal Air Force station located  south west of St Albans, Hertfordshire and  north east of Uxbridge, London, England.

History

It was established at a private golf club and was used as a headquarters facility for the United States Army Air Forces Eighth Air Force in the United Kingdom.  It was situated close to its Royal Air Force counterpart at RAF Bentley Priory, near Stanmore. It was also known as USAAF station 341.

During the war the facility was the headquarters for the United States Army Air Forces Eighth Air Force VIII Fighter Command (1942–45). Its name frequently led to the site being confused with Army Air Force Station 586 at Bushy Park in south-west London, which was the Headquarters of United States Strategic Air Forces (USSTAF) during 1944 and 1945.

It was the site of London Central Elementary High School, a  United States Department of Defense Dependents School, from 1962 to 1971. 

In 1955, the facility was returned to civil control.  It is now Bushey Hall Golf Club and Lincolnsfields Children's Centre.

See also
List of former Royal Air Force stations

References

Airfields of the United States Army Air Forces in the United Kingdom
Royal Air Force stations in Hertfordshire
Royal Air Force stations of World War II in the United Kingdom
1942 establishments in England
1955 disestablishments in England
Military installations closed in 1955